Kampong Glam Single Member Constituency was a single member constituency (SMC) in Kampong Glam, Singapore. It existed as Kampong Glam Constituency from 1959 to 1988 then it was renamed as Kampong Glam Single Member Constituency during political reform in 1988. Once a small constituency with no more than ca. 9,000 registered voters, Kampong Glam constituency voters rose immediately in 1976 with at least 16,000 voters turned out to polling places. The numbers never went down ever since.

The SMC lasted another term till 1991 when it was absorbed into Kampong Glam Group Representation Constituency (GRC). The GRC is disbanded in the next election in 1997 and Kampong Glam SMC was recreated. Again, the SMC lasted for another term before being merged into Jalan Besar GRC.

Member of Parliament

Elections

Elections in 1990s

Elections in 1980s

Elections in 1970s

Elections in 1960s

Elections in 1950s

References
1997 General Election's result
1988 General Election's result
1984 General Election's result
1980 General Election's result
1976 General Election's result
1972 General Election's result
1968 General Election's result
1963 General Election's result
1959 General Election's result

Singaporean electoral divisions
downtown Core (Singapore)